The Nature Park of India is a reserved area administered by the government of India. It is located in Kolkata.

See also 
Nicco Park

References 

Tourist attractions in Kolkata
Parks in Kolkata
Amusement parks in India
Buildings and structures in Kolkata